This is a list of notable artists who create video art. Artists in this list have gained recognition or proven their importance because their work has been shown in film and video festivals and contemporary art exhibitions of worldwide importance, such as the documenta or the Venice Biennale,  the Sao Paulo Art Biennial or exhibited in major modern or contemporary art museums and institutes.

Add names in alphabetical order.

Yael Bartana
A B C D E F G H I J K L M N O P Q R S T U V W X Y Z

A
 Vito Acconci
 Gustavo Aguerre
 Eija-Liisa Ahtila
 Peggy Ahwesh
 Doug Aitken
 Madeleine Altmann
 J Tobias Anderson
 Ant Farm (group)
 Eleanor Antin
 Arambilet
 Martin Arnold
 Knut Asdam
 Kutlug Ataman

B
 Benton C Bainbridge
 John Baldessari
 George Barber
Judith Barry
 Matthew Barney
 Sylvie Bélanger
Robin Bell
 Maurice Benayoun
 Lynda Benglis
 Sadie Benning
 Michael Betancourt
 Zarina Bhimji
 Janet Biggs
 Dara Birnbaum
 Helene Black
 Skip Blumberg
 Angie Bonino
 Joan Braderman
 Marco Brambilla
 Candice Breitz
 Olaf Breuning
 Klaus vom Bruch
 Bull.Miletic
 Chris Burden
 Nia Burks
 V. Owen Bush

C
 Peter Callas
 Colin Campbell
 Peter Campus
 Bruce Charlesworth
 Cheng Ran
 Cheryl (artist collective)
 Pierre Yves Clouin
 Nicole Cohen
Tony Cokes
 James Coleman
 Jordi Colomer
 Cecelia Condit
 Tony Conrad
 Chris Cunningham
 Andrea Crespo

D

 Douglas Davis
 Heiko Daxl
 Manon de Boer
 Anouk De Clercq
 Dimitri Devyatkin
 Malaka Dewapriya
 Willie Doherty
 Cecilia Dougherty
 Stan Douglas
 Juan Downey

E
 Ed Emshwiller
 Shahram Entekhabi
 Bill Etra
 Valie Export

F
 Ingrid Falk
 Omer Fast
 Ken Feingold
 Judy Fiskin
 Sadaf Foroughi
 Iain Forsyth and Jane Pollard
 Terry Fox
 Anna Frants
 Howard Fried
 Yang Fudong
 Ingeborg Fülepp
 Richard Fung

G
 Frank Gillette
 Judith Goddard
 Douglas Gordon
 Sigurður Guðjónsson
 Genco Gulan
 Sharon Grace
 Rodney Graham
 Antonio Jose Guzman

H
 David Hall
 Doug Hall
 Michelle Handelman
 Lynn Hershman Leeson
 Gary Hill
 Nan Hoover
 G. H. Hovagimyan
 Claire Hooper
 Madelon Hooykaas
 Ali Hossaini
 Teresa Hubbard / Alexander Birchler
 
 Pierre Huyghe

I

J
 Christian Jankowski
 Amy Jenkins
 Joan Jonas
 Stephen Jones
 Isaac Julien
 Jesper Just

K
 Wolf Kahlen
 Mike Kelley
 Soun-Gui Kim
 Olga Kisseleva
 Eva Koch
 Beryl Korot
 Marlene Kos
 Paul Kos 
 Mitchell Kriegman
 Paul Kuniholm

L
 Tony Labat
 Ine Lamers
 Lennie Lee
 LIA
 Kalup Linzy
 Liu Dao
Lohner Carlson
 Rafael Lozano-Hemmer
 Mary Lucier
 Cecilia Lundqvist

M
 Cynthia Maughan
 Paul McCarthy
 Jennifer & Kevin McCoy
 Laurie McDonald
 Christina McPhee
 Steve McQueen
 Bjørn Melhus
 Eric Millikin
 Jonathan Monaghan
 Joshua Mosley
 MTAA

N
 Shuli Nachshon
 Bruce Nauman
 Ray Navarro
 Shirin Neshat
 Graham Nicholls
 Danièle Nyst
 Jacques Louis Nyst

O
 Arthur Omar
 Orlan
 Tony Oursler
 Yoko Ono

P
 Nam June Paik
 Slobodan Pajic
 Laura Parnes
 Stephen Partridge
 Stefano Pasquini
 Relja Penezic
 Paul Pfeiffer

Q

R
 Charles Recher
 Jeanette Reinhardt
 Kelly Richardson
 Pipilotti Rist
 Don Ritter
 Miroslaw Rogala
 David Rokeby
 Julian Rosefeldt
 Martha Rosler

S
 Domingo Sarrey
 Peter Sarkisian
 Ira Schneider
 Joseph Seigenthaler
 Shelly Silver
 Lorna Simpson
 Ture Sjölander
 Guy Richards Smit
 Michael Snow
 Konstantia Sofokleous
 Lisa Steele
 Jana Sterbak
 Mitch Stratten
 System D-128
 Surekha

T
 Tim Tate
 Sam Taylor-Wood
 Diana Thater
 Gianni Toti
 Ryan Trecartin
 Wu Tsang
 Rob Tyler

U

V
 Anne-Mie van Kerckhoven
 Minnette Vári
 Steina and Woody Vasulka
 Bill Viola
 Barbara Visser
 Wolf Vostell

W
 Mark Wallinger
 Andy Warhol
 Gillian Wearing
 Peter Weibel
 Monika Weiss
 Pola Weiss Álvarez
 Roger Welch
 Lee Wells
 Tim White-Sobieski
 Jane and Louise Wilson
 Shaun Wilson
 Krzysztof Wodiczko
 Jordan Wolfson

Z
 Lydia Zimmermann

References

See also
 Video art
 New media art
 Video synthesizer

Video artists
 List